Lispector is a surname. Notable people with the surname include:

 Clarice Lispector (1920–1977), Brazilian novelist and short story writer
 Elisa Lispector (1911–1989), Brazilian novelist